Al-Tilal Sports Club is a Yemeni multi-sports club based in Aden, Yemen. The club was founded in 1905.Al -Tilal Sports Club is a Yemeni football team that plays in the Yemeni League , the country's top football league .

It was founded in 1905 under Al-Ittihad al-Mohammadi, the oldest football team in Yemen. He has won the league title on 2 occasions and 6 National Cup tournaments.

At the international level, they have participated in 5 continental tournaments, where their best participation has been in the 2012 AFC Cup, where they advanced to the Round of 16.

Achievements
 Yemeni League: 2
 1991, 2005
 Yemeni Presidents Cup: 2
 2007, 2010
 Yemeni Naseem Cup: 2
 2000, 2003
 Yemeni Unity Cup: 1
 1999
 Ali Muhsin al-Murisi Cup: 1
 2003

Performance in AFC competitions
 AFC Cup: 3 appearances
2009: Group Stage
2011: Group Stage
2012: Group Stage

 Asian Club Championship: 1 appearance
1992: Qualifying – Second Round

 Asian Cup Winners Cup: 1 appearance
1994–95: Withdrew in First Round

References

External links
 

Tilal
Association football clubs established in 1905
20th-century establishments in the Aden Protectorate
1905 establishments in Asia
1905 establishments in the British Empire